Odontoglossum tripudians is a species of orchid endemic to Colombia.

tripudians